Antonio Cagnoni (8 February 1828 – 30 April 1896) was an Italian composer. Primarily known for his twenty operas, his work is characterized by his use of leitmotifs and moderately dissonant harmonies. In addition to writing music for the stage, he composed a modest amount of sacred music, most notably a Requiem in 1888. He also contributed the third movement, Quid sum miser, to the Messa per Rossini, a collaborative work created by thirteen composers to honor Gioacchino Rossini.

Life and career

Born in Godiasco, Cagnoni first studied music composition privately in Voghera. He then studied at the Milan Conservatory where his first three operas, Rosalia di San Miniato (1845), I due savoiardi (1846), and Don Bucefalo, were premiered while he was a student. The latter work was particularly well received and enjoyed successful stagings at the Teatro Nacional de São Carlos (1850), Teatro di San Carlo (1853), the Teatro della Canobbiana (1854), and the Teatro Regio di Parma (1860) among others. He went on to compose 16 more operas and a pastiche, of which his most successful were Michele Perrin (1864), Claudia (1866), Un capriccio di donna (1870), Papà Martin (1871), and Francesca da Rimini (1878). His last opera, Re Lear, was completed in 1895 but did not premiere until 2009 when it was mounted at the Festival della Valle d'Itria.

In addition to his composition work, Cagnoni served as the maestro di cappella at the Vigevano Cathedral from 1852-1879 and served in the same capacity at the Novara Cathedral from 1879-1888. He became the director of the Civico Istituto Musicale in Bergamo in 1888, serving in that capacity until his death, in Bergamo, eight years later.

Operas

Rosalia di San Miniato (melodramma semiserio, 2 acts, libretto by Callisto Bassi, 28 February 1845, Milan Conservatory)
I due savoiardi (melodramma semiserio, 2 acts, libretto by Leopoldo Tarantini, 15 June 1846, Milan Conservatory)
Don Bucefalo (melodramma semiserio, 3 acts, libretto by Callisto Bassi, 28 June 1847, Milan Conservatory)
Il testamento di Figaro (melodramma comico, 2 acts, libretto by Callisto Bassi, 26 February 1848, Milan, Teatro Rè)
Amori e trappole (melodramma giocoso, 3 acts, libretto by Felice Romani, 27 April 1850, Genoa, Teatro Carlo Felice)
Il sindaco babbeo (opera comica, 3 acts, libretto by Giorgio Giachetti, 3 March 1851, Milan, Teatro di Santa Radegonda)
La valle d'Andorra (melodramma semiserio, 2 acts, libretto by Giorgio Giachetti, 7 June 1851, Milan, Teatro della Canobbiana)
Giralda (melodramma giocoso, 3 acts, libretto by Giorgio Giachetti and Raffaele Berninzone, 8 May 1852, Milan, Teatro di Santa Radegonda)
La fioraia (melodramma giocoso, 3 acts, libretto by Giorgio Giachetti, 24 November 1853, Turin, Teatro Nazionale)
La figlia di Don Liborio (opera buffa, 3 acts, libretto by Francesco Guidi, 18 October 1856, Genoa, Teatro Carlo Felice)
Il vecchio della montagna ossia L'emiro (tragedia lirica, 4 acts, libretto by Francesco Guidi, 5 September 1860, Turin, Teatro Carignano)
Michele Perrin (opera comica, 3 acts, libretto by Marco Marcelliano Marcello, 7 May 1864, Milan, Teatro di Santa Radegonda)
Claudia (dramma lirico, 4 acts, libretto by Marco Marcelliano Marcello, 20 May 1866, Milan, Teatro della Canobbiana)
La tombola (commedia lirica, 3 acts, libretto by Francesco Maria Piave, 18 January 1867, Rome, Torre Argentina)
La vergine di Kermo (melodramma romantico, 3 acts, a pastiche also containing music by Carlo Pedrotti, Federico Ricci, Amilcare Ponchielli, Giovanni Pacini, Lauro Rossi, and Alberto Mazzucato, libretto by Francesco Guidi, 16 February 1870, Cremona, Teatro Concordia)
Un capriccio di donna (melodramma serio, 1 prologue and 3 acts, libretto by Antonio Ghislanzoni, 10 March 1870, Genoa, Teatro Carlo Felice)
Papà Martin (opera semiseria, 3 acts, libretto by Antonio Ghislanzoni, 4 March 1871, Genoa, Teatro Politeama Tivoli)
Il duca di Tapigliano (opera comica, 1 prologue and 2 acts, libretto by Antonio Ghislanzoni, 10 October 1874, Lecco, Teatro Sociale) 
Francesca da Rimini' (tragedia lirica, 4 acts, libretto by  Antonio Ghislanzoni, 19 February 1878, Turin, Teatro Regio)
Re Lear (tragedia lirica, 4 acts, libretto by  Antonio Ghislanzoni, 19 July 2009, Martina Franca, Festival della Valle d'Itria)

References

External links
 
 List of operas on operone.de (based on the German MGG)] 

1828 births
1896 deaths
Italian classical composers
Italian male classical composers
Milan Conservatory alumni
Italian opera composers
Male opera composers
People from the Province of Pavia
19th-century classical composers
19th-century Italian composers
19th-century Italian male musicians